Freddy Herbrand (born 1 June 1944 Malmedy, Belgium) is a former Belgian decathlete.

Herbrand finished sixth at the 1972 Summer Olympics in Munich.

Herbrand became Belgian champion in the 110 metres hurdles in 1971 and 1972; high jump in 1964, 1965, 1967 and 1970; long jump in 1971 and 1972; triple jump in 1963, 1964 and 1965; and decathlon in 1968, 1970, 1971, and 1973.

References

1944 births
Living people
Sportspeople from Liège
Belgian decathletes
Belgian male long jumpers
Belgian male high jumpers
Belgian male triple jumpers
Belgian male hurdlers
Athletes (track and field) at the 1972 Summer Olympics
Olympic athletes of Belgium
20th-century Belgian people
21st-century Belgian people